Caudoeuraphia is a genus of star barnacles in the family Chthamalidae. There is one described species in Caudoeuraphia, C. caudata.

References

Barnacles